In Greek mythology, Ceroessa (Ancient Greek: Κερόεσσα Keroessa means "the horned") was a heroine of the foundational myth of Byzantium. She was the daughter of Io and Zeus; elder sister of Epaphus; and mother of Byzas, founder of Byzantium, with her uncle, Poseidon.

Story
According to the historian Hesychius of Miletus, as Io, changed into a heifer and being chased by a gadfly on behalf of the jealous Hera, was passing through Thrace, she gave birth to a girl, Keroessa, on the banks of the Golden Horn, by the altar of the nymph Semystra. According to legend, Keroessa's birthplace is called Semystra (today Eyüp district), where the rivers Kydaros (today Alibeyköy Stream) and Barbyses (today Kağıthane Stream) flow into the sea at the end of Chrysokeras (Golden Horn or Haliç). Semystra takes its name from the Semystra Altar, where today Eyyub El Ensari's tomb is located, and its water is believed to have healing powers. Keroessa was reared by Semystra and grew up surpassing other local maidens in beauty. She had intercourse with Poseidon and in due course  gave birth to a son, whom she named Byzas. He became the founder of Byzantium (today Sarayburnu, where Topkapı Palace was built) and named the Golden Horn (Greek Χρυσόκερας) after his mother. Ceroessa also had another son named Strombos. Strombos fought with his brother and the Byzantines.

According to Nonnus, Keroessa's birthplace was the same as that of her brother Epaphus, i. e. Egypt.

References

External links
History of Istanbul and Keroessa by Prof. Dr. Erendiz Ozbayoglu (in English)
Turkish Numismatic Society Bulletin No: 33 (in Turkish; Keroessa and History of Istanbul explained, together with the Istanbul Mint)  
Foundation of Istanbul, Virtual Istanbul 
Loves of Zeus (in English)
History of Istanbul, Istanbul Life (in English)
Republic of Turkey Ministry of Culture and Tourism (in English)

Children of Zeus
Constantinople
Women of Poseidon